Nwaneri is a surname. Notable people with the surname include:

Adanna Nwaneri (born 1975), Nigerian footballer
Ethan Nwaneri (born 2007), English footballer
Kelechi Nwaneri (born 1994), Nigerian artist
Obinna Nwaneri (born 1982), Nigerian footballer
Uche Nwaneri (born 1984), American YouTuber and football player
Victor Nwaneri (born 1993), Nigerian footballer